Phuleli is a canal in Hyderabad, Sindh, Pakistan. It's a non-perennial canal with a planned discharge capacity of 15000 cusec, was built in 1955 to address the irrigation water needs of the left bank regions of lower Sindh. The canal starts at the Ghulam Muhammad Barrage on the left side of the Indus River and runs through Hyderabad, Sindh's second biggest city. The canal water is mostly utilized for irrigation, although cities and villages within its authority also use it for household purposes. Phuleli has many songs, lyrics, poems and letters written in his praise.

Pollution 

Badin district suffers from poor sanitation, inadequate safe drinking water, and untreated sewage and residential waste disposal, as well as untreated industrial effluent disposal, all of which contribute to contamination, pollution, and public health hazards, as well as a loss of bio-diversity. 
When the Phuleli Canal runs through Hyderabad city, highly toxic effluent from plastic industries, illegal livestock pens, slaughterhouses, and municipal sewage water are directly poured into the canal, deteriorating the canal water quality and putting the millions of people's lives in danger.

References

Landforms of Pakistan
Canals in Pakistan